Ossetian, commonly referred to as Ossetic and rarely as Ossete, is an Eastern Iranian language that is spoken predominantly in Ossetia, a region situated on both sides of the Greater Caucasus. It is the native language of the Ossetian people, and is one of the few Iranian languages spoken in Europe; it is a relative and possibly a descendant of the extinct Scythian, Sarmatian, and Alanic languages.

The northern half of the Ossetia region is part of Russia and is known as North Ossetia–Alania, while the southern half is part of the de facto country of South Ossetia (recognized by the United Nations as Russian-occupied territory that is de jure part of Georgia). Ossetian-speakers number about 614,350, with 451,000 recorded in Russia per the 2010 Russian census.

History and classification
Ossetian is the spoken and literary language of the Ossetians, an Iranian ethnic group living in the central part of the Caucasus and constituting the basic population of North Ossetia–Alania, which is part of the Russian Federation, and of the de facto country of South Ossetia (recognized by the United Nations as de jure part of the Republic of Georgia). The Ossetian language belongs to the Iranian group of the Indo-European family of languages (as hinted by its endonym). Within Iranian, it is placed in the Eastern subgroup and further to a Northeastern sub-subgroup, but these are areal rather than genetic groups. The other Eastern Iranian languages such as Pashto (spoken in Afghanistan and Pakistan) and Yaghnobi (spoken in Tajikistan) show certain commonalities, but also deep-reaching divergences from Ossetian.

From the 7th–8th centuries BCE, the languages of the Iranian group were distributed across a vast territory spanning present-day Iran (Persia), Central Asia, Eastern Europe, and the Caucasus. Ossetian is the sole survivor of the branch of Iranian languages known as Scythian. The Scythian group included numerous tribes, known in ancient sources as the Scythians, the Massagetae, the Saka, the Sarmatians, the Alans, and the Roxolani. The more easterly Khwarazm and Sogdians were also closely affiliated in linguistic terms.

Ossetian, together with Kurdish, Tat, and Talysh, is one of the main Iranian languages with a sizable community of speakers in the Caucasus. As it is descended from Alanic, spoken by the Alan medieval tribes emerging from the earlier Sarmatians, it is believed to be the only surviving descendant of a Sarmatian language. The closest genetically related language may be the Yaghnobi language of Tajikistan, the only other living Northeastern Iranian language. Ossetian has a plural formed by the suffix -ta, a feature it shares with Yaghnobi, Sarmatian and the now-extinct Sogdian; this is taken as evidence of a formerly wide-ranging Iranian-language dialect continuum on the Central Asian steppe. The names of ancient Iranian tribes (as transmitted through Ancient Greek) in fact reflect this pluralization, e.g. Saromatae and Masagetae.

Evidence for Medieval Ossetian
The earliest known written sample of Ossetian is an inscription which dates back to the 10th–12th centuries and was found near the Bolshoy Zelenchuk River in Arkhyz, Russia. The text is written in the Greek alphabet, with special digraphs.

The only other extant record of Proto-Ossetic are the two lines of "Alanic" phrases appearing in the Theogony of John Tzetzes, a 12th century Byzantine poet and grammarian:

The portions in bold face above are Ossetian. Going beyond a direct transliteration of the Greek text, scholars have attempted a phonological reconstruction using the Greek as clues, thus, while τ (tau) would usually be given the value "t", it instead is "d", which is thought to be the way the early Ossetes would have pronounced it. The scholarly transliteration of the Alanic phrases is: "dӕ ban xʷӕrz, mӕ sfili, (ӕ)xsinjӕ kurθi kӕndӕ" and "du farnitz, kintzӕ mӕ sfili, kajci fӕ wa sawgin?"; equivalents in modern Ossetian would be "Dӕ bon xwarz, me’fšini ‘xšinӕ, kurdigӕj dӕ?" and "(De’) f(s)arm neč(ij), kinźi ӕfšini xӕcc(ӕ) (ku) fӕwwa sawgin". The passage translates as:

Marginalia of Greek religious books, with some parts (such as headlines) of the book translated into Old Ossetic, have recently been found.

It is theorized that during the Proto-Ossetic phase, Ossetian underwent a process of phonological change conditioned by a Rhythmusgesetz or "Rhythm-law" whereby nouns were divided into two classes, those heavily or lightly stressed. "Heavy-stem" nouns possessed a "heavy" long vowel or diphthong, and were stressed on the first-occurring syllable of this type; "light-stem" nouns were stressed on their final syllable. This is precisely the situation observed in the earliest (though admittedly scanty) records of Ossetian presented above. This situation also obtains in Modern Ossetian, although the emphasis in Digor is also affected by the "openness" of the vowel. The trend is also found in a glossary of the Jassic dialect dating from 1422.

Dialects
There are two important dialects: Digoron (distributed in the west of the Republic of North Ossetia-Alania and Kabardino-Balkaria) and Iron (in the rest of the Republic of North Ossetia-Alania and in South Ossetia and Karachay-Cherkessia), spoken by one-sixth and five-sixths of the population, respectively. A third dialect of Ossetian, Jassic, was formerly spoken in Hungary.

Phonology

The Iron dialect of Ossetic has 7 vowels:

The Digor dialect of Ossetic has 6 vowels:

The Ossetian researcher V. I. Abayev postulates 26 plain consonants for Ossetian, to which five labialized consonants and two semivowels may be added. Unusually for an Indo-European language, there is a series of glottalized (ejective) stops and affricates. This may constitute an areal feature of languages of the Caucasus.

Voiceless consonants become voiced word-medially (this is reflected in the orthography as well).

Lexical stress 
Stress normally falls on the first syllable, unless it contains a central vowel ( or ), in which case stress falls on the second syllable. Thus, су́дзаг|súdzag /ˈsud͡zag/ 'burning', but cӕнӕ́фсыр/sænǽfsyr /sɐˈnɐfsɘr/ 'grapes'. In addition, proper names are usually stressed on the second syllable regardless of their vowels, and recent Russian loanwords retain the stress they have in the source language.

In the Iron dialect, definiteness is expressed in words with stress on second syllable by shifting the stress to the initial syllable. This reflects the fact that historically they received a syllabic definite article (as they still do in the Digor dialect), and the addition of the syllable caused the stress to shift. The above patterns apply not just within the content word, rather to prosodic words, units that result from content words being joined into a single prosodic group with only one stress. Not only compound verbs, but also every noun phrase constitutes such a group containing only one stressed syllable, regardless of its length, for instance мӕ чи́ныг/mӕ čínyg /mɐˈt͡ʃinɘg/ 'my book', мӕгуы́р зӕронд лӕг/mæguýr zærond læg /mɐˈgwɘr zɐrond lɐg/ 'a poor old man'. Since an initial particle and a conjunction are also included in the prosodic group, the single stress of the group may fall on them, too: фӕлӕ́ уый/fælǽ uyj  'but he'.

Morphophonemic alternations 
1.In derivation or compounding, stems containing vowels /a o / <а o> change to the central vowel /ɐ/ <ӕ>, whereas those containing /i u/  < и/I у/u> may be replaced with /ɘ/:

 авд/avd /avd/ 'seven' — ӕвдӕм/ævdæm /ˈɐvdɐm/ 'seventh'.

2. Sequences /ɐ/ + /i/ (ӕ + и/i), /ɐ/ + /ə/ (ӕ + ы/y), and /ɐ/ + /ɐ/ (ӕ + ӕ) assimilate, yielding the vowel /е/ <e>.

3. the palatalisation of the velars к (k) to ч (č), г (g) to дж (dž) and къ (kh) to чъ (čh) before the (currently or historically) front vowels, namely е (e), и (i) and ы (y), for instance карк (kark) 'hen' — карчы (karčy) 'hen (genitive)'.

4. the voicing of voiceless consonants in voiced environments: тых (tyx) 'strength' — ӕмдых (æmdyx) 'of equal strength'.

5. consonant gemination in certain grammatical forms, such as after the prefix ны (ny-) and before the suffixes -ag and -on.

Grammar

According to V.I. Abaev,

Nouns

Ossetic has lost the grammatical category of gender which many Indo-European languages have preserved until today.
According to the Encyclopӕdia Britannica 2006 Ossetian preserves many archaic features of Old Iranian, such as eight cases and verbal prefixes. It is debated how many of these cases are actually inherited from Indo-Iranian case morphemes and how many have re-developed, after the loss of the original case forms, through cliticization of adverbs or re-interpretations of derivational suffixes: the number of "inherited" cases according to different scholars ranges from as few as three (nominative, genitive and inessive) to as many as six (nominative, dative, ablative, directive, inessive). Some (the comitative, equative, and adessive) are secondary beyond any doubt.

Definiteness
Definiteness in the Iron dialect is, according to Abaev, only expressed by shift of word accent from the second to the first syllable (which is not possible in all nouns):
 færǽt "an axe"
 fǽræt "the axe"

Erschler reported in 2021 that he has been unable to replicate Abaev's observations of a distinction between definite and indefinite nouns in Iron.

Number
There is only one plural suffix for the nominal parts of speech, -т(ӕ) -t(ӕ), with the vowel ӕ ӕ occurring in the nominative case (see Cases below): e.g. сӕр sӕr 'head' - сӕртӕ sӕrtӕ 'heads'. Nevertheless, the complexity of the system is increased to some extent by the fact that this suffixation may be accompanied by a number of morphophonemic alternations. A svarabhakti vowel ы y is normally inserted after stems ending in a cluster (цӕст cӕst 'flower' - цӕстытӕ cӕstytӕ 'flowers'),  but there are also numerous exceptions from this. This insertion of ы y regularly palatalises preceding velars to affricates in Iron: чызг čyzg 'girl' - чызджытӕ čyzdžytӕ 'girls'. In words ending in -ӕг ӕg, the vowel is usually elided in the plural, making the stem eligible for the above-mentioned svarabhakti insertion: барӕг barӕg 'rider' - барджытӕ bardžytӕ 'riders'. The same happens in words ending in -ыг -yg, but the consonant is also labialised there: мӕсыг mӕsyg - мӕсгуытӕ mӕsguytӕ. The vowels а a and о o in closed syllables are weakened to ӕ ӕ before the suffix - фарс fars 'side' - фӕрстӕ fӕrstӕ 'sides'; this happens regularly in polysyllabic words, but with many exceptions in monosyllabic ones. Finally, the suffix consonant is geminated after sonorants: хӕдзар xӕdzar 'house' - хӕдзӕрттӕ xӕdzӕrttӕ 'houses'.

Cases
Nouns and adjectives share the same morphology and distinguish two numbers (singular and plural) and nine cases: nominative, genitive, dative, directive, ablative, inessive, adessive, equative, and comitative. The nominal morphology is agglutinative: the case suffixes and the number suffix are separate, the case suffixes are the same for both numbers and the number suffix is the same for all cases (illustrated here for the Iron dialect with the noun сӕр sӕr "head"):

Since inessive and genitive show the same forms in both numbers, it is sometimes debated whether Ossetian might possess eight case forms for each number instead of nine. If the addition of the case suffix would result in hiatus, the consonant й j is usually inserted between them: зӕрдӕ-й-ӕн zærdæ-j-æn 'heart (dative)'.

Adjectives

There is no morphological distinction between adjectives and nouns in Ossetian. The suffix -дӕр -dær can express the meaning of a comparative degree: рӕсугъддӕр ræsuhddær 'more beautiful'. It, too, can be added to typical nouns: лӕг læg 'man' - лӕгдӕр lægdær 'more of a man, more manly'.

Pronouns

The personal pronouns mostly take the same endings as the nouns. The 1st and 2nd person singular exhibit suppletion between the stem used in the nominative case and the stem used in the other (oblique) cases; the oblique stem without other endings is the genitive case form. The 1st and 2nd persons plural have only one stem each, functioning as both nominative and genitive. The third person pronoun coincides with the demonstrative 'that'. In addition, there are enclitic non-nominative forms of the pronouns of all three persons, which are somewhat deviant. Their genitive ends in -ӕ -ӕ; not only the inessive, but also the ablative coincides with the genitive; the allative ends in -м -m and the dative has the vowel -у- -y- before the ending (e.g. мын myn); and the comitative has the vowel -е- -e- (e.g. мемӕ memӕ). The 3rd singular stem has the doublet forms йV- jV- and ∅V- everywhere outside of the ablative and inessive, which appears as дзы dzy, and the comitative, which can only have йV- jV-.

Reflexive forms are constructed from the enclitic forms of the personal pronouns and the reflexive pronoun хӕдӕг xӕdӕg 'self' (with the oblique forms хиц- xic- in the dative and ablative, хиу- xiu- in the adessive and хи xi in the other cases).

The interrogative pronouns are чи či (oblique stem кӕ- kӕ-) 'who' and сы cy (oblique stem сӕ- cӕ-). Indefinite pronouns meaning any- and some- are formed from the interrogatives by means of the prefix ис- is- and the suffix -дӕр -dӕr, respectively. Negatives are formed similarly, but with the prefix ни- ni-; the totality prefix ('every-') is ал- al-, and ӕлы ӕly is used adjectivally. Other pronouns meaning 'all' are ӕгас ӕgas and ӕппӕт ӕppӕt. There are two pronouns meaning 'other': иннӕ innӕ for 'another of two, a definite other one' and ӕндӕр ӕndӕr for 'some other, an indefinite other one'.

Verbs

Verbs distinguish six persons (1st, 2nd and 3rd, singular and plural), three tenses (present, past and future, all expressed synthetically), three moods (indicative, subjunctive, imperative), and belong to one of two grammatical aspects (perfective and imperfective). The person, tense and mood morphemes are mostly fused. The following description is of Iron.

Stems

Each verb has a present stem and a past stem (similar in practice to Persian), the latter normally being identical to the past participle. The past stem commonly differs from the present stem by adding т t or д d (e.g. дар- dar- : дард- dard- 'to hold'; уарз-  : уарзт  'to love'), or, more rarely, -ст -st (e.g. бар- bar : барст- barst 'weigh') or -ыд yd (зар- zar- : зарыд-  'sing'; nonetheless, the past participle of this type is still formed with -д/т t/d: зард- zard-). However, there are usually various other vowel and consonant changes as well. Some of the most common vowel alternations are ӕ ӕ : а a (e.g. кӕс- kӕs : каст- kast- 'look'), и i : ы y (e.g. риз- riz- : рызт- ryzt- 'tremble'), and у u : ы y (e.g. дзур- dzur- : дзырд- dzyrd- 'speak'); some other alternations are a a : ӕ ӕ (mostly in bisyllabic stems, e.g. араз- araz- : арӕз- arӕz- 'make'), ау au : ы y, ӕу ӕu : ы y, and о o : ы y. Frequent consonant changes are -д d, -т t, -тт tt, -нд nd, -нт nt > -ст st (e.g. кӕрд- kӕrd- : карст karst 'cut'), -дз dz, -ц -c, -ндз -ndz, -нц -nc > -гъд hd (лидз- lidz- : лыгъд-  'run away'), elision of a final н n or м m (e.g. нӕм nӕm : над nad). Suppletion is found in the stem pair дӕттын dӕttyn : лӕвӕрд lӕvӕrd 'give'. It is also seen in the copula, whose past stem is уыд- uyd-, whereas the present forms are highly irregular and begin in д- d-, ст- st- оr in a vowel (see below).

There are also many related transitive-intransitive verb pairs, which also differ by means of a vowel alternation (commonly а a : ӕ ӕ, e.g. сафын  'lose' : сӕфын sӕfyn 'be lost', and у u : уы uy, e.g. хъусын  'hear' : хъуысын  'be heard') and sometimes by the addition of the consonant -с s (тавын  'to warm' : тафсын  'to be warm').

Tense and mood conjugation

The present and future tense forms use the present stem.

The indicative present endings are as follows:

Only the copula uyn 'be' is conjugated differently: 

The copula also has a special iterative stem вӕйй- vӕjj-, which is conjugated regularly.

The future tense forms consist of the present stem, the element -дзы(н)- ~ -дзӕн-  (originally a separate root meaning 'wish' according to Fredrik Thordarson) and endings which appear to derive from encliticised copula уын uyn 'be' (see above table) used as an auxiliary. Thus, the resulting composite endings are:

The past tense uses the past stem. The endings, however, are different for intransitive and transitive verbs. The intransitive endings are:

The construction appears to be, in origin, a periphrastic combination of the past passive participle and the copula; that is why the endings are similar to the ones added to -дзы(н)-  in the future tense.

The transitive endings, on the other hand, are:

Remarkably, these forms actually derive from the old past subjunctive rather than the indicative (which is why the endings still almost entirely coincide with those of the future subjunctive, apart from the initial consonant т t). The variable -т- -t of the transitive as well as the intransitive past endings appear in verbs whose present stem ends in vowels and sonorants (й j, у u, р r, л l, м m, н n), since only these consonants are phonotactically compatible with a following sequence -дт- dt, which would normally arise from the combinations of the dentals of the stem and the ending: e.g. кал-д-т-он kal-d-t-on 'I poured', but саф-т-он saf-t-on 'I lost'.

The subjunctive mood has its own forms for each tense. The endings are as follows: 

In addition, a т t is added before the ending in transitive verbs. The future forms derive from the historical subjunctive and the others from the historical optative. In spite of some nuances and tendencies reflecting from their historical functions, there is a lot of overlap between the uses of the 'present-future' and the 'future' subjunctive (desire, possibility etc.), but a clear contrast between the two is found in conditional clauses, where the former expresses unreal conditions and the latter - real ones.

The imperative consists of the present stem and the following endings:

A special future imperative form can be formed by the addition of the independent particle иу iu.

Voice

Passive voice is expressed periphrastically with the past passive participle and an auxiliary verb цӕуын cӕuyn 'to go': аразын  'build' – арӕзт цӕуын arӕzt cӕuyn 'be built'; causative meaning is also expressed periphrastically by combining the infinitive and the verb кӕнын kӕnyn 'to do': e.g. бадын  'to sit' - бадын кӕнын  'to seat'. Reflexive meaning is expressed by adding the reflexive pronoun хи xi: дасын  'to shave (something, somebody)' – хи дасын  'shave oneself'.

Aspect

Somewhat similarly to the Slavic languages, verbs belong to one of two lexical aspects:  perfective vs. imperfective, and the aspects are most commonly expressed by prefixes of prepositional origin, which simultaneously express direction or other abstract meanings: цӕуын cӕuyn 'go (imperf.)' - рацӕуын racӕuyn 'go out (perf.). The directional prefixes simultaneously express ventive or andative direction: 

In addition, these prefixes may express small aspectual nuances: а- a- is used for rapid, brief and superficial motion, арба- arba- also for rapid and sudden action, ба- ba- for more substantial action, ны- ny- for especially intensive action, while фӕ- fӕ- can express habituality in the present and either repetition or rapidity and brevity in the past. A morphophonological peculiarity of the prefixes is that when they are added to roots beginning in the vowel а a, as well as to the copula's form ис is, the consonant ц c is epenthesised: фӕ-ц-ис fӕ-c-is 'became (3rd person)'. The prefix ны ny also causes gemination of the following consonant: кӕлын kӕlyn 'pour' - ныккӕлын nykkӕlyn 'spill'.

Iterativity or habituality may be expressed with the separate particle иу iu. To make a prefixed form receive imperfective meaning, the article цӕй cӕj is inserted: рацӕйцыди racӕjcydy 'he was going out'.

Non-finite verb forms

There is an infinitive, four participles (present and past active, past passive, and future), and a gerund.

The infinitive is formed from the present stem with the ending -ын -yn, which phonologically coincides with the 1st person singular: цӕуын cӕuyn 'to go' (and 'I go').

The past passive participle in -т t or -д d coincides with the past stem (фыссын  'write' – фыст fyst 'written'); it is often nominalised to a verbal noun. All the other participles, as well as the gerund, are formed from the present stem. The future participle in -инаг -inag may have either active or passive meaning: фыссинаг  'who will write / will be written'. Together with the copula used as an auxiliary, it forms a periphrastic immediate future tense. The dedicated active participles in -ӕг -ӕg and receive 'present' or 'past', or more accurately, imperfective or perfective meaning depending on the aspect of the stem: фыссӕг fyssӕg 'writing' – ныффыссӕг  'having written'. The participle-gerund form ending in -гӕ -gӕ  (бадгӕ badgӕ '(while) sitting'), can be used adverbially, as a gerund, but also attributively like a participle with absolutive voice: кӕрдгӕ kӕrdgӕ may mean '(which has been) cut', судзгӕ sudzgӕ may mean '(which is) burning', etc. To receive an unambiguously adverbial, i.e. gerundial interpretation, it needs to be declined in the ablative case, as does an adjective: бадгӕйӕ badgӕjӕ '(while) sitting'. There are also verbal nouns: one derived from the present stem with the suffix -ӕн -ӕn with the meaning 'fit to be X-ed' - e.g. зын ссарӕн zyn ssarӕn 'hard to find' - and one in -аг -ag denoting permanent quality - e.g. нуазаг nuazag 'drunkard'.

Syntax

Ossetic uses mostly postpositions (derived from nouns), although two prepositions exist in the language. Noun modifiers precede nouns. The word order is not rigid, but tends towards SOV. Wackernagel's law applies. The morphosyntactic alignment is nominative–accusative, although there is no accusative case: rather, the direct object is in the nominative (typically if inanimate or indefinite) or in the genitive (typically if animate or definite).

Numerals
For numerals above 20, two systems are in use – a decimal one used officially, and a vigesimal one used colloquially. The vigesimal system was predominant in traditional usage. The decimal one is said to have been used in pre-modern times by shepherds who had borrowed it from the Balkars, but it came into more general use only after its introduction in Ossetian schools in 1925 to facilitate the teaching of arithmetic. For example, 40 is цыппор  (from цыппар  'four') and 60 is ӕхсӕй æxsaj (from ӕхсӕз æxsæz 'six') in the decimal system, whereas the vigesimal designations are дыууиссӕдзы dywwissædzy (from дыууӕ dywwæ 'two' and ссӕдз ssædz 'twenty') and ӕртиссӕдзы ærtissædzy (from ӕртӕ ærtæ 'three' and ссӕдз ssædz 'twenty'). In the same way, the inherited decimal сӕдӕ sædæ 'one hundred' has the vigesimal equivalent фондзыссӕдзы fondzyssædzy ('5 times twenty'). An additional difference is that the decimal system places tens before units (35 is ӕртын фондз ærtyn fondz '30 + 5'), whereas the vigesimal uses the opposite order (35 is фынддӕс ӕмӕ сӕндз fynddæs æmæ ssædz '15 + 20'). Ordinal numbers are formed with the suffix -ӕм -æm, or, for the first three numbers, -аг -ag.

 1 иу iu
 2 дыууӕ dywwæ
 3 ӕртӕ ærtæ
 4 цыппар cyppar
 5 фондз fondz
 6 ӕхсӕз æxsæz
 7 авд avd
 8 аст ast
 9 фараст farast
 10 дӕс dæs
 11 иуæндæс iuændæs
 12 дыууадæс dyuuadæs
 13 æртындæс ærtyndæs
 14 цыппæрдæс cyppærdæs
 15 фынддӕс fynddæs
 16 æхсæрдæс æxsærdæs
 17 æвддæс ævddæs
 18 æстдæс æstdæs
 19 нудæс nudæs
 20 ссӕдз ssædz

1000 мин min, ӕрзӕ ærzæ
 1100 мин сӕдӕ min sædæ ('1000 + 100'), иуæндæс фондзыссӕдзы iuændæs fondzyssædzy ('11 X 100')
 2000 дыууӕ мины dyuuæ miny ('2 X 1000')
 1 000 000 милуан miluan

Writing system

An Old Ossetic Greek Script inscription of the 10th–12th centuries is found in Arxyz, the oldest known attestation of the Ossetian language.

Written Ossetian may be immediately recognized by its use of the Cyrillic letter Ae (Ӕ ӕ), a letter to be found in no other language using Cyrillic script. The father of the modern Ossetian literary language is the national poet Kosta Khetagurov (1859–1906).

An Iron literary language was established in the 18th century, written using the Cyrillic script in Russia and the Georgian script in Georgia. The first Ossetian book was published in Cyrillic in 1798, and in 1844 the alphabet was revised by a Russian scientist of Finland-Swedish origin, Andreas Sjögren. A new alphabet based on the Latin script was made official in the 1920s, but in 1937 a revised Cyrillic alphabet was introduced, with digraphs replacing most diacritics of the 1844 alphabet.

In 1820, I. Yalguzidze published a Georgian-script alphabetic primer, adding three letters to the Georgian alphabet. The Georgian orthography receded in the 19th century, but was made official with Georgian autonomy in 1937. The "one nation – two alphabets" issue caused discontent in South Ossetia in the year 1951 demanding reunification of the script, and in 1954 Georgian was replaced with the 1937 Cyrillic alphabet.

The table below shows the modern Cyrillic alphabet, used since 1937, with phonetic values for the Iron dialect in the IPA. Di- and tri-graphs in parentheses are not officially letters of the alphabet, but are listed here to represent phonemically distinctive sounds:

The Ossetian Wikipedia uses the Latin 'æ' instead of the Cyrillic 'ӕ'.

Language usage

The first printed book in Ossetian was a short catechism published in Moscow in 1798. The first newspaper, Iron Gâžêt, appeared on July 23, 1906, in Vladikavkaz.

While Ossetian is the official language in both South and North Ossetia (along with Russian), its official use is limited to publishing new laws in Ossetian newspapers. There are two daily newspapers in Ossetian: Ræstdzinad (Рӕстдзинад / Рӕстꚉінад, "Truth") in the North and Xurzærin (Хурзӕрин, "The Sun") in the South. Some smaller newspapers, such as district newspapers, use Ossetian for some articles. There is a monthly magazine Max dug (Мах дуг, "Our era"), mostly devoted to contemporary Ossetian fiction and poetry.

Ossetian is taught in secondary schools for all pupils. Native Ossetian speakers also take courses in Ossetian literature.

The first Ossetian language Bible was published in 2010. It is currently the only full version of the Bible in the Ossetian language. In May, 2021, the Russian Bible Society announced the completion of a Bible translation into Ossetian; fundraising continues in order to have it printed.

Sample text

See also
 Jász people

Notes

References

Bibliography
 Abaev, V.I. 1964. A grammatical sketch of Ossetic (Russian version)
 Abaev, V.I. Ossetian Language and Folklore, USSR Academy of Sciences, Moscow-Leningrad, 1949
 Arys-Djanaieva, Lora. Parlons Ossète. Paris: L'Harmattan, 2004, .
 
 
 
 
 
 
 
 Thordarson, Fridrik. Ossetic. In Rüdiger Schmitt (ed.), Compendium Linguarum Iranicarum, 456-479. Wiesbaden: Dr. Ludwig Reichert.

External links

 Web portal on documentation and grammatical studies of Ossetic 
 Ossetic National Corpus
 Genetic Evidence Concerning the Origins of South and North Ossetians
 An article on Ossetic grammar by Fridrik Thordarson
 Ossetic language page at the Minority languages of Russia on the Net  project 
 History of the Ossetian writing system and a comprehensive table of characters 
 Ossetic language materials in English and partly French
 Laboratory of Field Linguistics: Ossetic (studies on Ossetic grammar, modern spoken texts in Ossetic)  
 Omniglot – Ossetian (Ирон ӕвзаг / Дигорон ӕвзаг)
 Ossetic (Iron and Digor) basic lexicon at the Global Lexicostatistical Database
 Russian-Ossetic On-Line Dictionary

 
Eastern Iranian languages
Languages of Russia
Languages of Georgia (country)
Ossetia
Sarmatians